The Color of Time (aka Tar) is a 2012 American independent biographical drama film written and directed by twelve New York University film students whose teacher was James Franco. The film stars James Franco (who also produced), Mila Kunis, Jessica Chastain, Zach Braff, and Henry Hopper.

It premiered on November 16, 2012 at the Rome Film Festival. The film was theatrically released in the United Kingdom on September 8, 2014, under the title Forever Love. It was theatrically released in the United States on December 12, 2014.

Plot
The different parts of Pulitzer Prize winner C.K. Williams' life told through his poems. Flashbacks of his childhood, his teens, college years, to when he meets and marries his wife, Catherine (Kunis) and the birth of his children and parenthood. The film is narrated by different versions of Williams (Franco, Hopper, March, Unger), depicting the different aspects of Williams through the years.

Cast

 James Franco as C.K. Williams – age 40
 Mila Kunis as Catherine
 Jessica Chastain as Mrs. Williams
 Zach Braff as Albert
 Henry Hopper as C.K. Williams at a young age
 Bruce Campbell as Goody
 Vince Jolivette as Mr. Williams
 Jordan March as C.K. Williams in youth
 Zachary Unger as C.K. Williams – age 7
 Danika Yarosh as Irene
 Mia Serafino as Sarah
 Giavani Cairo as Dan
 Kathi J. Moore as Phyllis
 Ziam Penn as Ron
 Joshua Saba as John

Reception
On review aggregator Rotten Tomatoes, the film holds an approval rating of 5% based on 21 reviews, with an average rating of 3.70/10. Metacritic gives the film a weighted average score of 34 out of 100, based on 12 critics, indicating "generally unfavorable reviews".

Accolades
2012 Rome Film Festival: 
CinemaXXI Award (nomination) – Edna Luise Biesold, Sarah-Violet Bliss, Gabrielle Demeestere, Alexis Gambis, Shruti Ganguly, Brooke Goldfinch, Shripriya Mahesh, Pamela Romanowsky, Bruce Thierry Cheung, Tine Thomasen, Virginia Urreiztieta and Omar Zúñiga Hidalgo

Cubovision Prize (win) – James Franco

References

External links

2012 films
2010s coming-of-age drama films
American coming-of-age drama films
2010s English-language films
Films based on biographies
2012 drama films
2010s American films
2012 independent films